Clearwater River may refer to:

Rivers

In Canada
Clearwater River (Alberta), a tributary of the North Saskatchewan River in west-central Alberta
Clearwater River (British Columbia), a tributary of the Thompson River in British Columbia
Clearwater River (Saskatchewan), a tributary of the Athabasca River in northwestern Saskatchewan and northeastern Alberta
Clearwater River (Quebec), in northern Quebec, known also as Rivière à l'Eau Claire in French
Clearwater River was the original name given to the Chutine River

In New Zealand
Clearwater River (New Zealand), in the South Island of New Zealand

In the United States
Clearwater River (Idaho) in Idaho
Clearwater River (Mississippi River tributary) in central Minnesota
Clearwater River (Red Lake River) in northwestern Minnesota
Clearwater River (Montana) in southwest Montana
Clearwater River (Oregon) in Oregon
Clearwater River (Queets River) in Washington
Clearwater River (White River) in the Clearwater Wilderness of Washington

Other uses 
 Clearwater river (river type), a classification of rivers, used in contrast to white and blackwater rivers
 Clearwater River Dene Nation, a First Nations group in Saskatchewan
 Clearwater River Provincial Park, Saskatchewan
 Clearwater National Forest, along the Clearwater River in Idaho

See also
 Clearwater (disambiguation)
 Qingshui (disambiguation), the same name in Chinese
 Shimizu (disambiguation), the same name in Japanese